Michael Duke is an Australian former professional rugby league footballer who played in the 1980s. He played for Western Suburbs in the NSWRL competition.

Playing career
Duke made his first grade debut in round 21 of the 1980 NSWRFL season against South Sydney at Lidcombe Oval. Duke played a total of 69 games for Western Suburbs across five seasons. Duke played one finals game for the club which was the 1982 minor preliminary semi-final against Eastern Suburbs which Wests lost 11-7.

References

1961 births
Western Suburbs Magpies players
Australian rugby league players
Rugby league five-eighths
Rugby league locks
Rugby league second-rows
Living people